Xylochora is a genus of fungi in the family Amphisphaeriaceae.

References

External links
Index Fungorum

Xylariales